Arlette Grosskost (born 19 July 1953) was a member of the National Assembly of France.  She represented the Haut-Rhin department,  and is a member of The Republicans (France).

References

1953 births
Living people
People from Wissembourg
Rally for the Republic politicians
Union for a Popular Movement politicians
The Popular Right
Women members of the National Assembly (France)
Deputies of the 12th National Assembly of the French Fifth Republic
Deputies of the 13th National Assembly of the French Fifth Republic
Deputies of the 14th National Assembly of the French Fifth Republic
21st-century French women politicians